Susan Elizabeth Earle MBE (née Bawtree; born 17 May 1963) is a British writer, TV presenter, and entrepreneur. She has written over 35 books on beauty, nutrition, and wellbeing and is regularly seen on ITV’s This Morning. She is the founder of Liz Earle Wellbeing, a bi-monthly magazine, and Liz Earle Fair and Fine, a Fairtrade jewellery brand. She also co-founded the Liz Earle Beauty Co., a skincare company, in 1995.

Career 
Earle started her writing career as a beauty writer for Woman’s Journal, where she was encouraged to write her first book, Vital Oils. She has published more than 30 books on a range of beauty, health, and wellbeing topics.

Her books include The Good Menopause Guide, The Good Gut Guide, SKIN, Juice, Skin Secrets, 6-Week Shape Up Plan, Youthful Skin, Detox, Dry Skin and Eczema, Food Combining, Eat Yourself Beautiful, Healthy Menopause, Vitamins and Minerals, Evening Primrose Oil, Successful Slimming, Aromatherapy, The ACE Plan, Food Allergies, Liz Earle's Lifestyle Guide, New Natural Beauty, Acne, Post Natal Health, Vegetarian Cookery, Juicing, Liz Earle's Best Bikini Diet, Baby and Toddler Foods, Hair Loss, Save Your Skin, Antioxidants, Cod Liver Oil, Beating PMS, Healthy Pregnancy, Herbs for Health, Food Facts, and Beating Cellulite. The Good Gut Guide claimed the number one spot in Amazon’s Popular Medicine list in May 2017 and The Good Menopause Guide went straight into the number one spot on Amazon on publication day.

She first appeared on ITV’s This Morning, with husband and wife duo Richard Madeley and Judy Finnigan, and then left to host the first UK television programme on beauty, BBC1’s Beautywise. Her own series, Liz Earle’s Lifestyle, ran for three series on the ITV network and featured guests, such as Gordon Ramsay and Ken Hom, cooking from her own family kitchen. Her other TV credits include A-Z of Food and Beauty on the Carlton Food Network and GMTV on the ITV Network. Earle rejoined ITV’s This Morning in 2015 with a regular Inside-Out Beauty slot and in 2017 filmed a mini-series in Greece and Italy on living well which was screened on This Morning in January 2018. In October 2018 Earle showed BBC’s Countryfile around her West Country farm.

In 1995, together with her friend Kim Buckland, she co-founded Liz Earle Naturally Active Skincare on the Isle of Wight, which later became the Liz Earle Beauty Co. In 2010, it was sold to Avon for an undisclosed sum. In 2015, Avon sold the Liz Earle Beauty Co. to Walgreens Boots Alliance for £140 million. Earle remained a global ambassador to the beauty brand until May 2017 and then announced her departure to concentrate on new ventures. In 2013, Earle set up Liz Earle Wellbeing, a wellness website and later a bi-monthly magazine, podcast series and YouTube channel.  In March 2018 Hearst UK announced a publishing and partnership deal with Liz Earle Wellbeing. In 2015 she founded Liz Earle Fair and Fine, an ethical jewellery range.

Earle was honoured with an MBE for services to the beauty industry in November 1997.  She has received honorary doctorates from Portsmouth University in 2009 and from Staffordshire University in 2015.

Charity and campaigning 
Earle was one of the founding members of the Guild of Health Writers and co-founded the Food Labelling Agenda (FLAG). She is a Patron of Ace Africa; is an ambassador and advocate for several food-focused charities including The Soil Association, The Sustainable Food Trust, Tearfund, The Menopause Charity  and Compassion in World Farming and has fronted campaigns for The Prince’s Trust and the National Osteoporosis Society. She is also an Ambassador for Love British Food  and CURE International.

In 2010, she founded the humanitarian charity LiveTwice, which aims to give people a second chance

Personal life 
Earle is the daughter of Rear Admiral David Kenneth Bawtree and grew up in Portsmouth.

She is divorced and lives with her five children on a West Country farm.

References

1963 births
Living people
British television presenters
British writers
British businesspeople
Members of the Order of the British Empire